Wesley Whitehouse was the defending champion, but turned 18 years old during the season and, therefore, was ineligible to compete in Juniors.

Roger Federer defeated Irakli Labadze in the final, 6–4, 6–4 to win the boys' singles tennis title at the 1998 Wimbledon Championships. It was Federer's 4th juniors singles title. He would go on to win a record eight senior titles between 2003 and 2017, including five in a row between 2003–07.

Seeds

  Julien Jeanpierre (quarterfinals)
  Fernando González (first round)
  Cheng Wei-jen (third round)
  Robin Vik (second round)
  Roger Federer (champion)
  Flávio Saretta (quarterfinals)
  Irakli Labadze (final)
  Ricardo Mello (first round)
  Olivier Rochus (first round)
  José de Armas (quarterfinals)
  Taylor Dent (second round)
  Aisam-ul-Haq Qureshi (third round)
  Jacob Adaktusson (first round)
  Valentin Sanon (second round)
  Edgardo Massa (second round)
  Balázs Veress (first round)

Draw

Finals

Top half

Section 1

Section 2

Bottom half

Section 3

Section 4

References

External links

Boys' Singles
Wimbledon Championship by year – Boys' singles